Phodaga is a genus of blister beetles in the family Meloidae. There are at least two described species in Phodaga.

Species
These two species belong to the genus Phodaga:
 Phodaga alticeps LeConte, 1858
 Phodaga marmorata (Casey, 1891)

References

Further reading

 
 

Meloidae
Articles created by Qbugbot